Long Long Time Ago 2 (Chinese: 我们的故事2) is a 2016 Singaporean period film directed by Jack Neo. The film was released on 31 March 2016.

Sequel to Long Long Time Ago, the film is the second installment in the Long Long Time Ago film series.

Plot
Continuing from Long Long Time Ago, Zhao Di takes over her family farm with the help of Ah Long after the 1969 floods. After the government started reclaiming land for development in 1977, licensed owners like Zhao Di are compensated but her brother accuses her of having an affair with Ah Long to get the money for himself. Osman does not approve his son playing in a rock band as he fears the negative influence, causing his son to run away from home. Meanwhile, Ah Hee and Rani decide to get married but their traditional parents object their marriage.

Cast
 Aileen Tan as Lim Zhao Di
 Mark Lee as Lim Ah Kun, Zhao Di's younger brother
 Wang Lei as Si Shu, Zhao Di's father
 Ng Suan Loi as Ah Ma, Zhao Di's mother
 Benjamin Tan as Lim Ah Hee, Zhao Di's younger brother who is among the first batch of National Servicemen
 Cynthia Kuang as Su Ting, Zhao Di's eldest daughter
 Yan Li Xuan as young Su Ting
 Charmaine Sei as Ah Feng, Ah Kun's wife
 Ryan Lian as Ah Long, a gangster
 Suhaimi Yusof as Osman, a Malay food seller
 Nurijah binte Sahat as Fatimah, Osman's wife
 Silvarajoo Prakasam as Shamugen, a hawker inspector turned People's Association officer
 Bharathi Rani as Rani, Shamugen's daughter, Ah Hee's girlfriend and later wife
 Mastura Ahmad
 Nick Shen
 Yoo Ah Min
 Zhang Wei

Production

Filming
The film was filmed in Ipoh, Malaysia, especially in Kampung Cina Pusing together with the first part, starting in May 2015 for over 60 days.

While filming a scene of a sister rescuing her younger brother from a toilet he is stuck in, director Jack Neo insisted on a close-up shot of real faeces to show audiences what toilets in the 1960s were really like. For historical accuracy, Neo also requested actress Aileen Tan to grow her armpit hair for a brief show of it when her character, wearing a sleeveless blouse, raises her arms to tie her hair while working at a coal mine.

The scene of Ah Kun (Mark Lee) slapping his niece and nephew is real. The actors did over ten takes.

Familiar to Vasantham viewers, actress Bharathi Rani plays Rani in her first non-Tamil production.

Music video
The official music video of Long Long Time Ago 2 was released on YouTube on Apr 14, 2016. It was directed by Shawn Tan and cinematography was by Lincoln Lin of Famegate Studios.

Reception

Critical reception
Reception was mostly positive.

John Lui of The Straits Times gave the film 2.5/5. He praised the "personal" "small moments" but criticised how "what little authenticity that can be glimpsed is buried under a treacly layer of television-style drama". In addition, he found that "[a]lmost every moment is freighted with moral significance, heavily underscored by dialogue and music" and "[f]or all the suffering, shame and strife baked into the story, there's little inner life to the characters".

Rating the film 2/5, Whang Yee-ling of 8 Days noted that Jack Neo "seems emotionally and creatively depleted after putting much of his heart into writing-directing Long Long Time Ago" and that "even Neo's ear for vernacular humour fails him, and the Hokkien exchanges are strained". She also criticised the film's "simplistic lessons on racial harmony in addition to intergenerational strife". She concluded, "The story is merely marking time, the characters remaining one-note types over the decade".

Similarly, Yahoo! News Singapore found Long Long Time Ago 2 "not as good" as its first part, giving it a score of 3.5/5. While praising the film's "[c]ompelling family drama" and "refreshing take on relationships in Singapore", they noted that it "doesn’t provide the proper cathartic resolution to the many conflicts that arise", with "[t]oo many characters and plots to keep track of", "blatant product placement" and a "downer" of a "weak resolution".

Jeremy Sing of SINdie found the "discrepancy" in the two parts "so great", with Part Two filled with "preachiness, television-style histronics... in-your-face product placements" and "a paper-thin plot". While he praised the film for "bravely tackling a sensitive topic" of the interracial marriage between Ah Hee and Rani, Sing criticised the overall "weak plot development, characterisation, trite direction and its propensity to ‘teach’ the audience what we were supposed to gather from the film".

Box office
Long Long Time Ago 2 was ranked second in the Singapore box office to Batman v Superman: Dawn of Justice in its opening week. It earned $3.02 million to date. The total local box office of two films is over $7.1 million.

Sequels
After Long Long Time Ago 2, Director Jack Neo and producers have planned for four instalments for Long Long Time Ago film series, but production of part 3 and 4 depends on the box office results of the first two films. Neo states he still has many more stories from 1978 to 2016 to explore. 

A third part is eventually made, titled The Diam Diam Era, and is scheduled to be released on 26 November 2020. A fourth and final film, The Diam Diam Era Two, is also scheduled to be released in February 2021.

References

External links
 

2016 films
Hokkien-language films
2020s Mandarin-language films
Malay-language films
2020s English-language films
Singaporean comedy-drama films
Films shot in Singapore
Films shot in Malaysia
Films set in Singapore
Films directed by Jack Neo
Films about interracial romance